Flagler Executive Airport  is a county-owned public-use airport located three miles (5 km) east of the central business district of Bunnell, a city in Flagler County, Florida, United States. The airport's former FAA location identifiers were X47 and XFL. The airfield was originally constructed by the United States Navy during World War II as Naval Outlying Field Bunnell (NOLF Bunnell), an auxiliary airfield for flight training operations originating from nearby Naval Air Station Jacksonville, NAS Daytona Beach and NAS DeLand.  Following the end of the war, the airfield was transferred from the Navy to Flagler County for use as a general aviation airport.

According to the Federal Aviation Administration (FAA) data, the airport ranks as the fourth busiest in Florida out of 105 General Aviation airports, with 190,000 takeoffs and landings per year. This is primarily due to its use as a practice field by students from nearby Embry-Riddle Aeronautical University, adjacent to Daytona Beach International Airport. Due to the increase in air traffic, the Flagler County Airport now has an FAA Level 1 Contract Air Traffic Control Tower that operates from 7am - 9pm, 365 days per year.

Although most U.S. airports use the same three-letter location identifier for the FAA and IATA, Flagler County Airport is assigned FIN by the FAA but has no designation from the IATA.

The airport is also home to the Flagler Palm Coast Army Readiness Center that opened in October 2020.  Listed on the FAA Airport Diagram as a "National Guard Armory," the facility actually supports units of both the U.S. Army Reserve and the Florida Army National Guard.  Although no military aircraft are permanently assigned, the facility contains a flight line ramp area capable of accommodating UH-60 Blackhawk, CH-47 Chinook, and C-130 Hercules aircraft.

Facilities and aircraft 
 Runway 11/29: 5,500 x 100 ft (1,676 x 30 m), surface: asphalt
 Runway 6/24: 5,001 x 100 ft (1,524 x 30 m), surface: asphalt
 Runway 18W/36W: 3,000 x 500 ft (914 x 152 m), surface: water
 Helipad H1: 36 x 36 ft (11 x 11 m), surface: concrete/gravel

For the 12-month period ending February 8, 2018, the airport had 158,775 aircraft operations, an average of 435 per day: 100% general aviation and less than 1% military. In February 2022, there were 37 aircraft based at this airport: 30 single-engine, 2 multi-engine, 2 jet and 3 helicopter.

References

External links 
  brochure from CFASPP
 
 

Airports in Florida
Transportation buildings and structures in Flagler County, Florida
1940s establishments in Florida